The Forty-Seventh Wisconsin Legislature convened from  to  in regular session, and re-convened for a special session from , through .  During this term, legislative business was largely held in the north wing of the Wisconsin State Capitol, which was the only part of the capitol to remain intact after the 1904 fire.

This session saw passage of several signature progressive reforms pushed by Governor Robert M. La Follette.  Including the creation of a civil service commission to implement merit-based rules for all state government jobs, creation of new powers and commissions for railroad, public health, and tax regulation, and attempts to eliminate lobbying and corporate-funding of political campaigns.  This was also the first of several sessions in which Milwaukee County sent a substantial delegation of socialist democrats to the Legislature.

Senators representing even-numbered districts were newly elected for this session and were serving the first two years of a four-year term. Assembly members were elected to a two-year term. Assembly members and even-numbered senators were elected in the general election of November 8, 1904. Senators representing odd-numbered districts were serving the third and fourth year of a four-year term, having been elected in the general election of November 4, 1902.

Major events
 January 24, 1905: Wisconsin Governor  was elected United States Senator by the Wisconsin Legislature in joint session.  La Follette, who had just been re-elected as governor, then delayed accepting the office until the end of the year, leaving Wisconsin with only one U.S. senator for most of 1905.
 January 30, 1905: The United States Supreme Court decided the case of Swift & Co. v. United States, determining that the commerce clause of the U.S. constitution allowed the Congress to regulate monopolies.
 March 4, 1905: Second inauguration of President Theodore Roosevelt.
 June 30, 1905: Albert Einstein submitted his paper "On the Electrodynamics of Moving Bodies", establishing his theory of special relativity.
 July 21, 1905: The Taft–Katsura agreement was reached between representatives of the United States and the Empire of Japan, to define separate spheres of influence in east Asia.
 September 5, 1905: The Treaty of Portsmouth was signed at Kittery, Maine, by representatives of the Russian Empire and the Empire of Japan, bringing an end to the Russo-Japanese War.  U.S. President Theodore Roosevelt was later awarded the Nobel Peace Prize for his part in the negotiations.
 September 27, 1905: Albert Einstein submitted his paper "Does the Inertia of a Body Depend Upon Its Energy Content?", in which he postulated mass–energy equivalence.
 January 1, 1906:  officially resigned as Governor of Wisconsin and began his term as U.S. senator.  Lieutenant Governor James O. Davidson was sworn in as the 21st Governor of Wisconsin.
 February 7, 1906: The revolutionary British Navy battleship HMS Dreadnought was launched, kicking off a naval arms race with the Imperial German Navy.
 April 3, 1906: William H. Timlin was elected to a new seat on the Wisconsin Supreme Court.
 April 18, 1906: The 1906 San Francisco earthquake destroyed much of San Francisco, resulting in at least 3,000 deaths and leaving over 200,000 homeless.
 May 14, 1906: The Wisconsin Supreme Court decided the case Nunnemacher v. State (129 Wis. 190) in favor of the State of Wisconsin — validating the constitutionality of the new state inheritance tax.
 August 23, 1906: Forces of the United States military arrived in Cuba at the request of embattled president Tomás Estrada Palma, beginning the second occupation of Cuba.
 November 3, 1906: SOS became an internationally recognized signal of distress.
 November 6, 1906: James O. Davidson elected Governor of Wisconsin.

Major legislation
 April 26, 1905: An Act providing for the location of a state normal school at the city of La Crosse, and making an appropriation therefor, 1905 Act 121.  Origin of the University of Wisconsin–La Crosse.
 May 12, 1905: An Act prescribing the duties of physicians and others relative to infectious diseases, 1905 Act 192.  Mandated reporting of statistics of certain infectious diseases to state health authorities, and setting requirements for quarantining, decontamination, and public information.  Also criminalized interfering with public health actions, and mandated reporting of any such interferance.  
 May 12, 1905: An Act relating to inn-keepers and for the promotion of the public health, 1905 Act 198. Required innkeepers to deny service to people suffering from communicable diseases.
 June 5, 1905: An Act regulating automobiles, auto-cars and other similar motor vehicles on the public highways within the state, 1905 Act 305.  First law for registration and licensing of automobiles in the state, and establishing speed limits.
 June 13, 1905: An Act to regulate railroads and other common carriers in this state, create a board of railroad commissioners, fix their salaries, define their duties, prevent the imposition of unreasonable rates, prevent unjust discriminations, insure an adequate railway service, prescribe the mode of procedure and the rules of evidence in relation thereto, prescribe penalties for violations, and making an appropriation therefor, 1905 Act 362. Abolished the statewide elected office of Railroad Commissioner and created a board of commissioners.
 June 14, 1905: An Act in relation to the civil service of the state of Wisconsin and making an appropriation, 1905 Act 363. Established a civil service commission and mandated that all future government appointments must follow merit-based rules defined by the civil service commission.
 June 19, 1905: An Act to amend chapter 569 of the laws of 1901 entitled "An Act to detach certain territory from the county of Chippewa and to create the county of Gates," 1905 Act 463.  Renamed Gates County to Rusk County.
 June 20, 1905: An Act prohibiting legislative counsel and agents from attempting to influence members of the legislature other than by appearance before the committees therof, 1905 Act 473.  Attempted to ban lobbying.
 June 21, 1905: An Act relating to the use of money by corporations in elections, 1905 Act 492.  Attempted to ban corporations from spending money on political campaigns or candidates.
 Joint Resolution granting return of confederate flags to state of Alabama, 1905 Joint Resolution 10.  Returned several regimental flags captured by Wisconsin regiments during the American Civil War.
 Joint Resolution providing for an amendment to section 10, article 8 of the constitution, relating to internal improvement, 1905 Joint Resolution 11.  First legislative passage of a proposed amendment to authorize appropriations for highway construction.
 1905 Joint Resolution 12. Proposing an amendment to the state constitution to allow an income tax.  This amendment had different language from a similar 1903 proposed amendment, and therefore was the first legislative passage of the amendment.
 Joint Resolution to amend section 10 article 5 of the constitution relating to the approval of bills by the governor, 1905 Joint Resolution 14.  First legislative passage of a proposed amendment to put a time limit on gubernatorial vetos.
 Joint Resolution providing for an amemlnient to section 1 of article 3 of the constitution, relating to electors, 1905 Joint Resolution 15.  First legislative passage of a proposed amendment to remove voting rights from non-citizens.

Summary

Senate summary

Assembly summary

Sessions
 1st Regular session: January 11, 1905June 21, 1905
 December 1905 Special session: December 4, 1905December 19, 1905

Leaders

Senate leadership
 President of the Senate: James O. Davidson (R) (until Jan. 1, 1906)
 President pro tempore: James J. McGillivray (R–Black River Falls)

Assembly leadership
 Speaker of the Assembly: Irvine Lenroot (R–Superior)

Members

Members of the Senate
Members of the Senate for the Forty-Seventh Wisconsin Legislature:

Members of the Assembly
Members of the Assembly for the Forty-Seventh Wisconsin Legislature:

Committees

Senate committees
 Senate Committee on AgricultureG. Wylie, chair
 Senate Committee on Assessment and Collection of TaxesHudnall, chair
 Senate Committee on CorporationsBeach, chair
 Senate Committee on EducationJ. H. Stout, chair
 Senate Committee on Enrolled BillsMerton, chair
 Senate Committee on Engrossed BillsWilcox, chair
 Senate Committee on Federal RelationsFroemming, chair
 Senate Committee on Finance, Banks, and InsuranceJ. E. Roehr, chair
 Senate Committee on the JudiciaryA. L. Kreutzer, chair
 Senate Committee on Legislative ExpensesStevens, chair
 Senate Committee on Manufactures and LaborRummel, chair
 Senate Committee on Military AffairsFrear, chair
 Senate Committee on Privileges and ElectionsMartin, chair
 Senate Committee on Public HealthNoble, chair
 Senate Committee on Public LandsC. C. Rogers, chair
 Senate Committee on RailroadsHatton, chair
 Senate Committee on Roads and BridgesG. W. Wolff, chair
 Senate Committee on State AffairsMunson, chair
 Senate Committee on Town and County OrganizationsSanborn, chair

Assembly committees
 Assembly Committee on AgricultureJ. A. Fridd, chair
 Assembly Committee on Assessment and Collection of TaxesA. H. Dahl, chair
 Assembly Committee on CitiesW. W. Andrew, chair
 Assembly Committee on CorporationsF. J. Carpenter, chair
 Assembly Committee on Dairy and FoodJ. S. Donald, chair
 Assembly Committee on EducationD. McGregor, chair
 Assembly Committee on Enrolled BillsF. J. Bohri, chair
 Assembly Committee on Engrossed BillsJ. S. Bletcher, chair
 Assembly Committee on Federal RelationsA. J. Jerdee, chair
 Assembly Committee on Finance, Banks, and InsuranceR. E. Tarrell, chair
 Assembly Committee on the JudiciaryH. L. Ekern, chair
 Assembly Committee on Legislative ExpendituresR. C. Smelker, chair
 Assembly Committee on Lumber and MiningG. E. Beedle, chair
 Assembly Committee on ManufacturesP. H. Hamm, chair
 Assembly Committee on Military AffairsJ. A. Henry, chair
 Assembly Committee on Privileges and ElectionsE. W. LeRoy, chair
 Assembly Committee on Public Health and SanitationJ. Dinsdale, chair
 Assembly Committee on Public ImprovementsJ. P. Chandler, chair
 Assembly Committee on Public LandsG. P. Stevens, chair
 Assembly Committee on RailroadsW. S. Braddock, chair
 Assembly Committee on Roads and BridgesT. Johnson, chair
 Assembly Committee on State AffairsO. G. Kinney, chair
 Assembly Committee on Town and County OrganizationW. S. Irvine, chair
 Assembly Committee on Ways and MeansF. Hartung, chair

Joint committees
 Joint Committee on Charitable and Penal InstitutionsHagemeister(Sen.) & H. Johnson (Asm.), co-chairs
 Joint Committee on ClaimsBurns (Sen.) & R. Ainsworth (Asm.), co-chairs
 Joint Committee on Fish and GameWipperman (Sen.) & J. Swenholt (Asm.), co-chairs
 Joint Committee on Forestry and LumberBird (Sen.) & E. E. Winch (Asm.), co-chairs
 Joint Committee on PrintingMorris (Sen.) & J. B. Hagarty (Asm.), co-chairs
 Joint Committee on Revision of BillsWhitehead (Sen.) & R. C. Smelker (Asm.), co-chairs
 Special Joint Committee on Capitol and GroundsStout (Sen.) & I. L. Lenroot (Asm.), co-chairs
 Special Joint Committee on RulesJohnson (Sen.) & H. L. Ekern (Asm.), co-chairs

Employees

Senate employees
 Chief Clerk: Leo K. Eaton
 Journal Clerk: A. R. Emerson
 Bookkeeper: J. D. O'Brien
 General Clerk: Ralph Pomeroy
 Engrossing Clerk: H. Wipperman Jr.
 Enrolling Clerk: O. G. Briggs
 Sergeant-at-Arms: Russell C. Falconer
 Assistant Sergeant-at-Arms: Charles Good
 Document Clerk: Thomas Walby
 Postmaster: Christoph Paulus

Assembly employees
 Chief Clerk: C. O. Marsh
 Journal Clerk: Chas. A. Leicht
 Bookkeeper: C. E. Shaffer
 General Clerk: Ralph E. Smith
 2nd General Clerk: L. B. Nagler
 Enrolling Clerk: A. W. Pott
 Engrossing Clerk: J. E. Noyes
 Sergeant-at-Arms: Nicholas Streveler
 Assistant Sergeant-at-Arms: C. H. Collins
 2nd Assistant Sergeant-at-Arms: Walter Eagan
 Document Clerk: Burne Pollock
 Postmaster: John Harris

Notes

References

External links
 1905: Related Documents from Wisconsin Legislature

1905 in Wisconsin
1906 in Wisconsin
Wisconsin
Wisconsin legislative sessions